Komarodin (born 19 July 1995) is an Indonesian professional footballer who plays as a winger for Liga 1 club Persikabo 1973.

Club career

Gresik United 
Komarodin signed with Gresik United in 2016. He scored his first Liga 1 goal in a 2–1 victory against Persiba Balikpapan.

PSIS Semarang 
Komarodin move to PSIS Semarang in December 2017. He made his debut on 25 March 2018 against PSM Makassar. On 22 July, Komarodin scored his first goal for PSIS against Persebaya Surabaya. 

Komarodin scored his first goal of the 2019 season on 22 November 2019, in an 2–1 win game against TIRA-Persikabo. He scored against Arema on 8 December. 

Komarodin appeared in total 88 matches for PSIS Semarang over four seasons, contributing five goals and six assists.

PSS Sleman
Komarodin signed for Liga 1 side PSS Sleman in 2022. He made his league debut on 23 July against PSM Makassar. He officially left PSS after half a season, appearing only seven times for the club.

Career statistics

Club

Notes

References

External links
 Komarodin at Soccerway

1995 births
Living people
Indonesian footballers
Association football forwards
Liga 1 (Indonesia) players
Persegres Gresik players
Gresik United players
PSIS Semarang players
PSS Sleman players
People from Kendal Regency
Sportspeople from Central Java